The ECB Premier Leagues are a series of regional cricket leagues organised by the England and Wales Cricket Board (ECB) that form the top tier of club cricket in England and Wales. The ECB published "Raising the Standard" in 1997, the ECB Management Board Blueprint for the Future Playing Structure of cricket. This introduced the concept of ECB Premier Leagues, designed to raise the playing standard of the top tier of club cricket and to bridge the gap between recreational cricket and the First Class game. A national network of Premier Leagues was established, with funding from the ECB. The Leagues have to meet the published ECB assessment criteria and they receive accreditation on an annual basis.

Premier Leagues are expected to establish links to other leagues in order to allow ambitious clubs to aspire to Premier League status over time. Many were based on existing leagues although some new Regional Premier Leagues were created. The ECB decided that overseas players are allowed to play in this top tier of club cricket provided that there is only one overseas player in any Premier League club team, which mirrors the arrangements for overseas players in the club cricket structures in countries such as Australia and South Africa.

The Premier League clubs must show a strong commitment to junior cricket and the assessment criteria explicitly require strong junior sections that can provide cricket coaching and matches for the next generation of cricketers. There is also an increased emphasis on practice and the development of skills for the adult players in Premier League clubs.

Current ECB Premier Leagues

 Birmingham and District Premier League
 Bradford Premier League
 Cheshire County Cricket League
 Cornwall Cricket League
 Derbyshire County Cricket League
 Devon Cricket League
 East Anglian Premier Cricket League
 Essex Cricket League
 Hertfordshire Cricket League
 Home Counties Premier Cricket League
 Kent Cricket League
 Leicestershire and Rutland Cricket League
 Lincolnshire Premier League
 Liverpool and District Cricket Competition
 Middlesex County Cricket League

 North East Premier League
 North Staffordshire and South Cheshire League
 North Wales Cricket League
 North Yorkshire and South Durham Cricket League
 Northamptonshire Cricket League
 Northern Premier Cricket League
 Nottinghamshire Cricket Board Premier League
 South Wales Premier Cricket League
 Southern Premier Cricket League
 Surrey Championship
 Sussex Cricket League
 West of England Premier League
 Yorkshire Premier League North
 Yorkshire South Premier League

Former ECB Premier League
 Yorkshire ECB County Premier League - dissolved after 2015 season and replaced by Yorkshire Premier League North and Yorkshire South Premier League

See also
England and Wales Cricket Board
List of English and Welsh cricket league clubs

External links
 ECB Premier Leagues
ECB Premier Leagues

 
English domestic cricket competitions